The 2014 IIHF World Championship Division I was a pair of international ice hockey tournaments organized by the International Ice Hockey Federation. Group A contested in Goyang, South Korea, and Group B contested in Vilnius, Lithuania, both running from 20 to 26 April 2014. Divisions I A and I B represent the second and the third tier of the Ice Hockey World Championships.

Division I A

Participants

Standings

Results
All times are local (KST – UTC+9).

Awards and statistics

Awards
Best players selected by the directorate:
 Best Goalkeeper:  Yutaka Fukufuji
 Best Defenseman:  Dominique Heinrich
 Best Forward:  Jan Muršak
Source: IIHF.com

Scoring leaders
List shows the top skaters sorted by points, then goals.

GP = Games played; G = Goals; A = Assists; Pts = Points; +/− = Plus/minus; PIM = Penalties in minutes; POS = PositionSource: IIHF.com

Leading goaltenders
Only the top five goaltenders, based on save percentage, who have played at least 40% of their team's minutes, are included in this list.
TOI = Time on Ice (minutes:seconds); SA = Shots against; GA = Goals against; GAA = Goals against average; Sv% = Save percentage; SO = ShutoutsSource: IIHF.com

Division I B

Participants

Standings

Results
All times are local (EEST – UTC+3).

Awards and statistics

Awards

Best players selected by the directorate:
 Best Goalkeeper:  Przemyslaw Odrobny
 Best Defenseman:  Alan Letang
 Best Forward:  Dainius Zubrus
Source: IIHF.com

Scoring leaders
List shows the top skaters sorted by points, then goals.

GP = Games played; G = Goals; A = Assists; Pts = Points; +/− = Plus/minus; PIM = Penalties in minutes; POS = PositionSource: IIHF.com

Leading goaltenders
Only the top five goaltenders, based on save percentage, who have played at least 40% of their team's minutes, are included in this list.
TOI = Time on Ice (minutes:seconds); SA = Shots against; GA = Goals against; GAA = Goals against average; Sv% = Save percentage; SO = ShutoutsSource: IIHF.com

References

External links
Group A on IIHF.com
Group B on IIHF.com

IIHF World Championship Division I
2
2014 IIHF World Championship Division I
2014 IIHF World Championship Division I
IIHF World Championship Division I
2014 IIHF World Championship Division I
2014 IIHF World Championship Division I
21st century in Vilnius
April 2014 sports events in Europe
IIHF
April 2014 sports events in North America